Flavia Seia Isaurica (floruit 141) was an ancient Roman businesswoman.

She was the domina (owner) of six brick clay beds in Campania, of which she owned at least two alone, and employed at least ten foremen, officinatores. She belonged to the more successful in the brick industry at the time and was active from 115 until at least 141. She is regarded as a significant example of a successful Roman businesswoman from her day and has been the subject of research.

References 

 Colin Chant,   The Pre-industrial Cities and Technology Reader
 
 International Conference on Women's History, Current Issues in Women's History

2nd-century Roman women
Ancient businesswomen
Ancient Roman merchants
Seii (Romans)
Flavii